My Little Sister is a 2020 Swiss drama film written and directed by Stéphanie Chuat and Véronique Reymond. It was selected to compete for the Golden Bear in the main competition section at the 70th Berlin International Film Festival. It was selected as the Swiss entry for the Best International Feature Film at the 93rd Academy Awards, but it was not nominated.

Plot
A gifted playwright pushes her twin sibling, a famous stage actor, back into the limelight though he's suffering from cancer.

Cast
Nina Hoss as Lisa
Lars Eidinger as Sven
Marthe Keller as Kathy
Jens Albinus as Martin

Reception
On review aggregator Rotten Tomatoes, the film holds an approval rating of 94% based on 35 reviews, with an average rating of 7.1/10. The website's critics consensus reads, "Led by first-rate performances from its stars, My Little Sister explores familial bonds and terminal illness with honesty and sensitivity". On Metacritic, the film has a weighted average score of 75 out of 100, based on 13 critics, indicating "generally favorable reviews".

Peter Bradshaw of The Guardian called My Little Sister a "fierce and fraught family drama", while Wendy Ide of The Observer called the film a "terrific, prickly sibling drama".

Ty Burr of The Boston Globe called the film "a bracing trip", and "a work of daredevil nerve that serves as its own reward".

According to Anna Smith of Deadline Hollywood, the film is "moving without being mawkish".

See also
List of submissions to the 93rd Academy Awards for Best International Feature Film
List of Swiss submissions for the Academy Award for Best International Feature Film

References

External links

2020 drama films
2020 LGBT-related films
2020s German-language films
Swiss drama films
Swiss LGBT-related films
LGBT-related drama films